Elliptio congaraea, the Carolina slabshell, is a species of freshwater mussel, an aquatic bivalve mollusk in the family Unionidae, the river mussels.

Distribution
This species is endemic to the southeastern United States.

References

congaraea
Molluscs of the United States
Bivalves described in 1831
Taxonomy articles created by Polbot